The Deadly Awards recognise achievement by Indigenous Australians in music, sport, the arts and in community service. First held in 1995, in 2008 the ceremony was hosted by Luke Carroll at the Sydney Opera House on 9 October 2008 and was broadcast on the Special Broadcasting Service (SBS) and National Indigenous Television Service (NITV) on 12 October 2008.

Music

Sport

The arts

Community

References

External links
Vibe Australia The Deadlys 2008
Emily Dunn and Elicia Murray  Deadly lot of awards for Yunupingu SMH (10 October 2008)

2008 in Australian music
The Deadly Awards
Indigenous Australia-related lists